Emarginula is a genus of small keyhole limpets, marine gastropod molluscs in the family Fissurellidae.

Description
The oval shell is obliquely conical with a backward-pointing recurved apex. There is a deep incision in the anterior margin. A distinct anal fasciole extends upwards from this incision. The surface is latticed, sculptured with radial ribs. There is no septum inside.

Radula
The radula has a dental formula of [many].1.4.1.4.1.[many], with a wide, rectangular, acuspate rachidian tooth.
The various genera have a few dozen rows of teeth.

Species
According to the World Register of Marine Species (WoRMS), species within the genus Emarginula include:

 Emarginula adamsiana Sowerby in Adams & Sowerby, 1863
 Emarginula adriatica Costa O.G., 1829
 Emarginula agulhasensis Thiele, 1925
 Emarginula alba Watson, 1897
 Emarginula amyda Shikama, 1962
 Emarginula angusta McLean, 1970
 Emarginula annielangleitae Poppe & Tagaro, 2020
 Emarginula apolonia Pacaud, 2015
 Emarginula balicasagensis Poppe & Tagaro, 2020
 Emarginula bicancellata Montrouzier, 1860
 Emarginula bonfittoi Smriglio & Mariottini, 2001
 Emarginula boucheti Poppe & Tagaro, 2020
 Emarginula camilla Melvill & Standen, 1903
 Emarginula candida Adams, 1852
 Emarginula choristes Dall, 1925
 Emarginula christiaensi Piani, 1985
 Emarginula circumalbum Poppe & Tagaro, 2020
 Emarginula clypeus Adams, 1852
 Emarginula colipanoae Poppe & Tagaro, 2020
 Emarginula compta Habe, 1953
 Emarginula concinna Adams, 1852
 Emarginula connectens Thiele, 1915
 Emarginula connelli Kilburn, 1978
 Emarginula convexa Hedley, 1907
 Emarginula costulata Deshayes, 1863
 Emarginula crassa Sowerby, 1812
 Emarginula crassicostata Sowerby in Adams & Sowerby, 1863
 Emarginula curvamen Iredale, 1925
 Emarginula cuvieri Audouin, 1827 (species inquirenda)
 Emarginula decorata Deshayes, 1863
 Emarginula delonguevilleae Poppe & Tagaro, 2020
 Emarginula devota Thiele, 1915
 Emarginula dictya McLean, 1970
 Emarginula dilecta Adams, 1852
 Emarginula divae (van Aartsen & Carrozza, 1995)
 Emarginula dubia Schepman, 1908
 † Emarginula espibosensis Lozouet, 1999
 † Emarginula fenestrata Deshayes, 1861 †
 Emarginula fenestrella Deshayes, 1863
 Emarginula fissura (Linnaeus, 1758) - slit limpet
 † Emarginula fossorensis Lozouet, 1999 
 Emarginula foveolata Schepman, 1908
 Emarginula foveolata fugitai Habe, 1953
 Emarginula fragilis Yokoyama, 1920
 Emarginula fulginea Adams, 1851
 Emarginula gabensis (Gabriel, 1961)
 † Emarginula galeriformis Marwick, 1928 
 † Emarginula gigantea Poppe, 2008
 Emarginula gustavi Poppe & Tagaro, 2020
 Emarginula hataii Habe, 1953
 Emarginula hawaiiensis Dall, 1895
 † Emarginula haweraensis Powell, 1931 
 Emarginula hosoyai Habe, 1953
 Emarginula huzardii (Payraudeau, 1826)
 Emarginula icosisculpta Simone & Cunha, 2014 
 Emarginula imaizumi Dall, 1926
 † Emarginula imbricata Millet, 1865 
 Emarginula imella Dall, 1926
 Emarginula intervecta Locard, 1898: synonym of Emarginula fissura (Linnaeus, 1758)
 Emarginula janae Cossignani, 2020
 Emarginula japonica Sowerby in Adams & Sowerby, 1863
 Emarginula jungcheni K.-Y. Lai, 2019
 † Emarginula kaiparica Laws, 1939 
 Emarginula kashimaensis Shikama, 1962
 † Emarginula komitica Laws, 1939 
 Emarginula koon Kilburn, 1978
 Emarginula lata J.R.C. Quoy & J.P. Gaimard, 1834 
 Emarginula liuzzii Poppe & Tagaro, 2020
 Emarginula longifissa Sowerby, 1866
 Emarginula lorenzoi Giusti & Micali, 2019
 Emarginula macclurgi Kilburn, 1978
 Emarginula mactanensis Poppe & Tagaro, 2020
 Emarginula maculata Adams in Adams & Sowerby, 1863
 Emarginula margarita Poppe & Tagaro, 2020
 Emarginula micans Adams, 1852
 Emarginula multistriata Jeffreys, 1882
 Emarginula natalensis Barnard, 1963
 Emarginula nigromaculata (Thiele, 1930)
 Emarginula nordica Pérez Farfante, 1947 - northern emarginula
 † Emarginula oblonga Sandberger, 1859 
 Emarginula obovata Adams, 1852
 Emarginula octaviana Coen, 1939
 Emarginula oppressa Barnard, 1963
 Emarginula paivana (Crosse, 1867)
 Emarginula patula Cotton, 1930
 † Emarginula paucicostata Laws, 1936 
 Emarginula paucipunctata Schepman, 1908
 Emarginula philippinensis Poppe & Tagaro, 2020
 Emarginula phrixodes Dall, 1927 - ruffled emarginula
 Emarginula pittensis Marwick, 1928 
 Emarginula poppeorum Romani & Crocetta, 2017
 † Emarginula praesicula Lozouet, 1999 
 Emarginula puncticulata Adams, 1852
 Emarginula punctulum Piani, 1980
 Emarginula pustula Thiele in Küster, 1913
 Emarginula quadrata Poppe & Tagaro, 2020
 Emarginula regia Habe, 1953
 Emarginula retecosa Adams, 1851
 Emarginula rosea Bell, 1824
 Emarginula scabriuscula Adams, 1852
 Emarginula sicula Gray, 1825 - dagger emarginula
 Emarginula sinica Lu, 1986
 Emarginula solidula Costa, 1829
 Emarginula souverbiana Pilsbry, 1890
 Emarginula spinosa Deshayes, 1863
 Emarginula striatula Quoy and Gaimard, 1834 - dagger emarginula 
 Emarginula subtilitexta Verco, 1908
 Emarginula superba Hedley, 1906
 Emarginula suspira Simone & Cunha, 2014 
 Emarginula tenera Locard, 1892
 † Emarginula teneraeformis Lozouet, 1999
 Emarginula tenuicostata Sowerby, 1863
 Emarginula teramachii Habe, 1953
 Emarginula textilis Gould, 1859 in 1859-61
 Emarginula thomasi Crosse, 1864
 Emarginula thorektes Kilburn, 1978
 Emarginula tosaensis Habe, 1953
 Emarginula tuberculosa Libassi, 1859 - tuberculate emarginula
 Emarginula undulata Melvill & Standen, 1903
 Emarginula velascoensis Shasky, 1961
 Emarginula velascoi Rehder, 1980
 Emarginula viridibrunneis Poppe & Tagaro, 2020
 Emarginula viridicana Herbert & Kilburn, 1985
 Emarginula viridis Poppe & Tagaro, 2020
 Emarginula xishaensis Lu, 1986
 Emarginula yangeorum Poppe & Tagaro, 2020

The following species are mentioned in other databases :
The Indo-Pacific Molluscan Database also mentions the following species with names in current use :
 Emarginula curvata Schepman, 1908
 Emarginula multisquamosa Schepman, 1908
 Emarginula sublaevis Schepman, 1908

 Subgenus Emarginula Lamarck, 1801
 Emarginula bellula Adams, 1851
 Emarginula cucullata Adams, 1851
 Emarginula fissurata Adams, 1851
 Emarginula harmilensis Sturany, 1903
 Emarginula plana Schepman, 1908
 Emarginula scabricostata Adams, 1851
Subgenus Emarginula (Subzeidora) Iredale, 1924

Species brought into synonymy
 Emarginula altilis Gould, 1859: synonym of Variemarginula punctata (A. Adams, 1852)
 Emarginula amitina Iredale, 1925: synonym of Emarginula dilecta A. Adams, 1852
 Emarginula angustata Thiele, 1915: synonym of Tugali decussata A. Adams, 1852
 Emarginula arabica A. Adams, 1852: synonym of Octomarginula arabica (A. Adams, 1852)
 Emarginula arconatii Issel, 1869: synonym of Montfortista panhi (Quoy & Gaimard, 1834)
 Emarginula australis Quoy & Gaimard, 1834: synonym of Montfortia subemarginata (Blainville, 1819)
 Emarginula bella Gabb, 1865: synonym of Scelidotoma bella (Gabb, 1865)
 Emarginula biangulata Sowerby, 1901: synonym of Emarginella biangulata (G. B. Sowerby III, 1901)
 †  Emarginula blainvillii Defrance, 1825: synonym of  † Rimula blainvillii (Defrance, 1825) 
 Emarginula brevirimata Deshayes, 1862: synonym of Montfortula brevirimata (Deshayes, 1862)
 Emarginula clathrata A. Adams & Reeve, 1850: synonym of Montfortista panhi (Quoy & Gaimard, 1834)
 Emarginula clathrata Pease, 1863: synonym of Emarginula dilecta A. Adams, 1852
 Emarginula conica Lamarck, 1801: synonym of Emarginula fissura (Linnaeus, 1758)
 Emarginula conica Schumacher, 1817 non Lamarck, 1801: synonym of Emarginula rosea Bell, 1824
 Emarginula dentigera Heilprin, 1889: synonym of Hemimarginula dentigera (Heilprin, 1889)
 Emarginula elata Locard, 1898: synonym of Emarginula christiaensi Piani, 1985
 Emarginula elongata O. G. Costa, 1829: synonym of Emarginula octaviana Coen, 1939
 Emarginula eximia A. Adams, 1852: synonym of Emarginella eximia (A. Adams, 1852) 
 Emarginula flindersi Cotton, 1930: synonym of Emarginula convexa Hedley, 1907
 Emarginula fuliginea Kuroda, 1941: synonym of Variemarginula variegata (A. Adams, 1852)
 Emarginula guernei Dautzenberg & Fischer, 1896: synonym of Emarginula tuberculosa Libassi, 1859
 Emarginula hedleyi Thiele, 1915: synonym of Emarginula candida A. Adams, 1852
 Emarginula incisula(sic): synonym of Emarginella incisura (A. Adams, 1852)
 Emarginula incisura A. Adams, 1852: synonym of Emarginella incisura (A. Adams, 1852)
 Emarginula kimberti Cotton, 1930: synonym of Laeviemarginula kimberti (Cotton, 1930)
 Emarginula modesta H. Adams, 1872: synonym of Hemimarginula modesta (H. Adams, 1872)
 Emarginula muelleri Forbes & Hanley, 1849: synonym of Emarginula fissura (Linnaeus, 1758)
 Emarginula ostheimerae Abbott, 1958: synonym of Octomarginula ostheimerae (Abbott, 1958)
 Emarginula panhi Quoy & Gaimard, 1834: synonym of Montfortista panhi (Quoy & Gaimard, 1834)
 Emarginula papillosa Risso 1826: synonym of Emarginula huzardii Payraudeau, 1826
 Emarginula parmophoidea Quoy & Gaimard, 1834: synonym of Tugali elegans Gray, 1843
 Emarginula peasei Thiele, 1915: synonym of Emarginula dilecta A. Adams, 1852
 Emarginula phrygium Herbert & Kilburn, 1985: synonym of Agariste phrygium (Herbert & Kilburn, 1986) (original combination)
 Emarginula picta Dunker, 1860: synonym of Montfortula picta (Dunker, 1860)
 Emarginula pileata Gould, 1859: synonym of Variemarginula punctata (A. Adams, 1852)
 Emarginula pileum Heilprin, 1889: synonym of Hemimarginula pileum (Heilprin, 1889)
 Emarginula planulata A. Adams, 1852: synonym of Emarginella planulata (A. Adams, 1852)
 Emarginula polygonalis A. Adams, 1852: synonym of Hemitoma polygonalis (A. Adams, 1852)
 Emarginula pulchreclathrata Tomlin, 1932: synonym of Emarginula agulhasensis Thiele, 1925
 Emarginula pumila A. Adams, 1852: synonym of Hemimarginula pumila (A. Adams, 1852)
 Emarginula punctata A. Adams, 1852: synonym of Variemarginula punctata (A. Adams, 1852)
 Emarginula reticulata Sowerby, 1813: synonym of Emarginula fissura (Linnaeus, 1758)
 Emarginula rugosa Quoy & Gaimard, 1834: synonym of Montfortula rugosa (Quoy & Gaimard, 1834)
 Emarginula scutellata Deshayes, 1863: synonym of Octomarginula scutellata (Deshayes, 1863)
 Emarginula sibogae Schepman, 1908: synonym of Emarginella sibogae (Schepman, 1908)
 Emarginula simpla Christiaens, 1987: synonym of Hemimarginula simpla (Christiaens, 1987)
 Emarginula stellata A. Adams, 1852: synonym of Montfortula rugosa (Quoy & Gaimard, 1834)
 Emarginula subclathrata Pilsbry, 1890: synonym of Emarginula dilecta A. Adams, 1852
 Emarginula subemarginata Blainville, 1819: synonym of Montfortia subemarginata (Blainville, 1819)
 Emarginula subrugosa Thiele, 1916: synonym of Hemimarginula subrugosa (Thiele, 1916)
 Emarginula sulcifera A. Adams, 1852: synonym of Montfortulana sulcifera (A. Adams, 1852)
 Emarginula tricarinata Pilsbry, 1890: synonym of Montfortista panhi (Quoy & Gaimard, 1834)
 Emarginula tricostata G.B. Sowerby I, 1823: synonym of Hemitoma octoradiata (Gmelin, 1791)
 Emarginula vadososinuata Yokoyama, 1922: synonym of Tugalina vadososinuata (Yokoyama, 1922)
 Emarginula vadum Barnard, 1963: synonym of Emarginula undulata Melvill & Standen, 1903
 Emarginula variegata A. Adams, 1852: synonym of Variemarginula variegata (A. Adams, 1852)

References

 
 Powell A W B, New Zealand Mollusca, William Collins Publishers Ltd, Auckland, New Zealand 1979 
 Piani P. (1985). Revisione del genere Emarginula Lamarck, 1801 in Mediterraneo. Lavori, Società Italiana di Malacologia 21: 193-238
 Gofas, S.; Le Renard, J.; Bouchet, P. (2001). Mollusca, in: Costello, M.J. et al. (Ed.) (2001). European register of marine species: a check-list of the marine species in Europe and a bibliography of guides to their identification. Collection Patrimoines Naturels, 50: pp. 180–213
 Rolán E., 2005. Malacological Fauna From The Cape Verde Archipelago. Part 1, Polyplacophora and Gastropoda.
 Spencer, H.; Marshall. B. (2009). All Mollusca except Opisthobranchia. In: Gordon, D. (Ed.) (2009). New Zealand Inventory of Biodiversity. Volume One: Kingdom Animalia. 584 pp

Fissurellidae
Gastropod genera
Taxa named by Jean-Baptiste Lamarck